Northam is a town in the Waterberg District Municipality in the Limpopo province of South Africa, 54 km  south of Thabazimbi.

History
The town was proclaimed in 1946 by E.H.J. Fulls on the farm Leeukoppie, which belonged to H. Herd, and was originally one of a number of farms allocated to British veterans of the Anglo-Boer war.

Economy
There are chrome and platinum mines in the area surrounding the town.

Culture and contemporary life
Northam is also home to the South African music festival Oppikoppi., which attracts hundreds of artists and thousands of fans every year in August.

References

Populated places in the Thabazimbi Local Municipality